Revolution Beauty is a UK based beauty company that was founded in 2014 by Adam Minto and Tom Allsworth, it provides makeup, skincare and hair products. The brand currently has 220 employees and an annual turnover of $139 Million. Their products are sold online as well as carried in Boots, Superdrug, Ulta and Target stores.

History 
Revolution Beauty is based around the principles of inclusivity and affordability in makeup, with the brand making sure to add a diverse range of affordable products.

The brand is well known for its use of influencer marketing. Revolution Beauty makes use of social media, most prominently Instagram and TikTok, as opposed to more traditional marketing methods.

The company has faced claims from brands such as Kat Von D and beauty YouTuber Manny MUA for allegedly plagiarizing makeup designs and concepts, claims which co-founder Adam Minto denies.

All Revolution products are all cruelty free, with 76% of the brand stocking vegan products.

In 2019, Revolution Beauty was named within the Sunday Times Fast Track 100 as the fastest growing beauty brand in the UK.

In 2021, Revolution Beauty made its stock market debut, with Jupiter Asset Management and Chrysalis Investments pledging shares.

References 

Personal care brands
Cosmetics companies of the United Kingdom
British companies established in 2015